Cyperus hilgendorfianus is a species of sedge that is endemic to eastern parts of Asia.

The species was first formally described by the botanist Johann Otto Boeckeler in 1884.

See also 
 List of Cyperus species

References 

hilgendorfianus
Taxa named by Johann Otto Boeckeler
Plants described in 1884
Flora of Japan
Flora of China